The Heart Lake First Nation is a First Nations band government in northern Alberta. A signatory to Treaty 6, it controls two Indian reserves, Heart Lake 167 and Heart Lake 167A, as well as sharing ownership of another, Blue Quills.

Notable people
Marvin Francis, writer

References

First Nations governments in Alberta
Cree governments